Julian Vedey (b. Warwickshire, 1898– d. Worthing, 1967) was a British actor.

Selected filmography
 Romance in Rhythm (1934)
 Cafe Mascot (1936)
 Strange Cargo (1936)
 Full Speed Ahead (1936)
 Command Performance (1937)
 The Green Cockatoo (1937)
 Saturday Night Revue (1937)
 Calling All Ma's (1937)
 Night Ride (1937)
 Missing, Believed Married (1937)
 Keep Fit (1937)
 Melody and Romance (1937)
 Sunset in Vienna (1937)
 Keep Smiling (1938)
 Kicking the Moon Around (1938)
 A Spot of Bother (1938)
 What Would You Do, Chums? (1939)
 Inspector Hornleigh (1939)
 We'll Smile Again (1942)
 The Bells Go Down (1943)

References

External links

1898 births
1967 deaths
English male film actors
People from Warwickshire
20th-century English male actors